Yuliya Gennadyevna Novikova (born 18 February 1973) is a Russian film and stage actress.

She graduated from the Schepkin Drama School. She also worked in the Mark Rozovsky Theater as a theater actress.

Her first acting role was Grand Duchess Olga in Gleb Panfilov's The Romanovs: A Crowned Family (2000).

Filmography
 Romanovy: Ventsenosnaya semya (2000)
 S lyubovyu. Lilya (2003)
 Golova Klassika (2005)
 Carousel  (2005)
 V kruge pervom  (2006)

External links

1973 births
Living people
Russian film actresses
Russian television actresses
Russian stage actresses